Agios Thomas is a small village about 5 km from Preveza in Greece. It is set in an agricultural area, but also has a busy harbour. There are four taverns and one cafe. Savvas is the largest popular tavern in the village for family events due to its view over the harbour. Daliani is not as large a tavern as Savvas nor does it offer the same view of the harbor. The third tavern is on the seafront and the last tavern is on the road out to Agioi Apostoloi and Skafedaki. Inhabitants of nearby Preveza frequently visit the village.

Populated places in Preveza (regional unit)